Chaitan Bharadwaj (born 2 August 1988) is an Indian music composer who works predominantly in Tollywood and Telugu Music. He is best known for composing the music album of the 2018 Tollywood film RX 100. He composed the song "Pillaa Raa".

Early life and career 
Bharadwaj born as Yadhavally Prabhakar Chaitanya in Visakhapatnam. He graduated from Gandhi Institute of Technology and Management, Visakhapatnam. He worked as a software engineer before being a music composer.

He started his career with the music album of the 2018 Tollywood film RX 100. The single "Pillaa Raa" from the album was successful. The album was positively received.

After the huge success of RX 100 music album, he further worked as a music composer in the films Guna 369 and Seven.

Discography

As composer

As playback singer

Awards and nominations

References

External links 
 

People from Visakhapatnam
People from Visakhapatnam district
Telugu film score composers
21st-century Indian composers
Film musicians from Andhra Pradesh
Musicians from Visakhapatnam
Musicians from Andhra Pradesh
1988 births
Living people
Telugu people